Jabour is a region of Rio de Janeiro, Recently officially recognized as a neighborhood.

References

Geography of Rio de Janeiro (city)